Mahadeo Bodoe (born 3 December 1966) is a Trinidadian cricketer. He played in twenty first-class and four List A matches for Trinidad and Tobago from 1984 to 1997.

See also
 List of Trinidadian representative cricketers

References

External links
 

1966 births
Living people
Trinidad and Tobago cricketers